Cyclo may refer to:

 Cycle rickshaw, the pedal-powered version of the rickshaw
 Cyclo (film), a 1995 Vietnamese film
 Cyclo (Ryoji Ikeda and Carsten Nicolai album), a 2001 album by Ryoji Ikeda and Carsten Nicolai
 Cyclo (Zazie album), a 2013 album by Zazie
 A chemical compound with a cyclic structure such as a cycloalkane
 Cyclo Industries, an American chemical company
 Le Cyclo, an innovative early French bicycle company

See also
 Cyclo-cross bicycle
 Cyclos, online banking software
 Cyclos (album), by Dilate